Fred Davis Chappell (born May 28, 1936 in Canton, North Carolina) is an author and poet.  He was an English professor for 40 years (1964–2004) at the University of North Carolina at Greensboro. He was the Poet Laureate of North Carolina from 1997–2002. He attended Duke University.

His 1968 novel Dagon, which was named the Best Foreign Book of the Year by the Académie française, is a recasting of a Cthulhu Mythos horror story as a psychologically realistic Southern Gothic.

His literary awards include the Aiken Taylor Award for Modern American Poetry, the Prix de Meilleur des Livres Etrangers, the Bollingen Prize, and the T. S. Eliot Award.

Bibliography

Books

Poetry
 
 Backsass, LSU Press, 2004.
 Bloodfire: A Poem, LSU Press, 1978.
 C, LSU Press, 1993.
 Castle Tzingal, LSU Press, 1984.
 Driftlake: A Lieder Cycle, Iron Mountain Press, 1981.
 Earthsleep: A Poem, LSU Press, 1980.
 Familiars, LSU Press, 2014.
 Family Gathering, LSU Press, 2000.
 First and Last Words, LSU Press, 1989.
 The Man Twice Married by Fire, Unicorn Press, 1975.
 Midquest: A Poem (contains "River: A Poem", "Bloodfire: A Poem", "Windmountain: A Poem", and "Earthsleep: A Poem"), LSU Press, 1981.
 River: A Poem, LSU Press, 1975.
 Shadow Box: Poems, :Louisiana State University Press, 2009
 Source, LSU Press, 1986.
 Spring Garden: New and Selected Poems, LSU Press, 1995.
 Wind Mountain: A Poem, LSU Press, 1979.
 The World Between the Eyes, LSU Press, 1971.

Fiction
 A Shadow All of Light, Tor Books, 2016
 
 Dagon, Harcourt, 1968, reprinted, St. Martin's, 1986. Reissued, Boson Books, 2002
 The Gaudy Place 
 The Inkling   Reprinted LSU Press 1998. 
 It Is Time, Lord  Reprint LSU Press 1996.   
 Moments of Light 
 More Shapes Than One, 1991

The Kirkman Tetralogy:
 I Am One of You Forever, LSU Press, 1985
 Brighten the Corner Where You Are, St. Martin's, 1989
 Farewell, I'm Bound to Leave You 
 Look Back All the Green Valley

Other
 The Fred Chappell Reader, St. Martin's, 1987.
 Plow Naked: Selected Writings on Poetry, University of Michigan Press, 1993.
 A Way of Happening: Observations of Contemporary Poetry, Picador, 1998.

Short stories
 "The Adder" Deathrealm (Summer 1989)
 "Free Hand" Deathrealm (Spring 1990)
 "The Lodger" (1994 World Fantasy Award winner)
 "The Somewhere Doors" (1992 World Fantasy Award winner)
 Stories about Falco the Shadow Master's Apprentice.
 "Creeper Shadows" Cat Tales: Fantastic Feline Fiction (Wildside Press, Compilation  2008 by George H. Scithers(former editor of Weird Tales.): 135–175
 "Dance of Shadows" Fantasy and Science Fiction 112/3 (March 2007): 6–37 & Year's Best Fantasy 8, (Jun 2008, ed. David G. Hartwell, Kathryn Cramer, publ. Tachyon Publications, 1-892391-76-7, 375pp, tp, anth)
 "The Diamond Shadow" Fantasy and Science Fiction 113/4&5 (October/November 2007): 42–74 
 "Shadow of the Valley" Fantasy and Science Fiction 116/2 (February 2009): 5–40 & 
 "Thief of Shadows" Fantasy and Science Fiction 118/5&6 (May/June 2010): 50–75
 "Maze of Shadows" Fantasy and Science Fiction 122/5&6 (May/June 2012): 69–135

Book reviews

See also

List of horror fiction authors

References

External links
 Review of Fred Chappell's writings 
 Online resources on Fred Chappell 
Interview with Fred Chappell 
 Guide to the Fred Chappell Papers, Rubenstein Rare Book and Manuscript Library, Duke University
Finding Aid for the Fred Chappell-Lee Kinard Interviews at The University of North Carolina at Greensboro
UNCG Oral History with Fred Chappell

Stuart Wright Collection: Fred Chappell Papers (#1169-017), East Carolina Manuscript Collection, J. Y. Joyner Library, East Carolina University
Fred Chappell (biographical note and extensive bibliography) at The Poetry Foundation

1936 births
Living people
People from Canton, North Carolina
20th-century American novelists
Novelists from North Carolina
Cthulhu Mythos writers
World Fantasy Award-winning writers
Poets Laureate of North Carolina
Poets from North Carolina
Bollingen Prize recipients
20th-century American poets
American male novelists
Writers of American Southern literature
American male poets
20th-century American male writers